The 1951 New Zealand tour rugby to Australia was the 18th tour by the New Zealand national rugby union team to Australia. 

The last tour of "All Blacks" in Australia was the 1947 tour, then in 1949 were the Australians to visit New Zealand.

All Blacks won all the three test matches and won the Bledisloe Cup, lost in 1949.

The tour 
Scores and results list All Blacks points tally first.

External links 
 New Zealand in Australia 1951 from rugbymuseum.co.nz

New Zealand
New Zealand tour
tour
New Zealand national rugby union team tours of Australia